And Then Came Lola is a 2009 comedy-drama film jointly written, directed and produced by Ellen Seidler and Megan Siler.

Premise 
Lola is a photographer, who is ready to take things to the next level with her new girlfriend, Casey. Lola sets out to run an errand for Casey, involving delivering some crucial prints for a business meeting with Danielle, who is also Casey's ex. Lola runs out the door, and what follows is a series of high-speed encounters and obstacles that threaten to keep her from her destination. These encounters run the gamut from the mundane to the unlikely, sometimes repeating themselves with different results, each presented using different cinematic techniques that control the mood and pace.

Cast

Release 
The film premiered on June 19, 2009 at the San Francisco Frameline LGBT Film Festival, and went on to screen at over 100 additional festivals.

Reception 
After Ellen reviewer Danielle Riendeau called the film "a combination of Run Lola Run and Groundhog Day", that "plays out like a twisty, lighter Run Lola Run with a massive dose of queerness", and described some of the photographic sequences as "funny, campy and wildly imaginative". The CinemaQueer review likewise found the film "sweet and likable", and reviewer Michael D. Klemm felt that "first time filmmakers Ellen Seidler and Megan Siler undoubtedly had a ball making this film and it shows". Autostraddle called And Then Came Lola a "funny guilty pleasure indie flick set in the super gay-ed up streets of San Francisco".

Awards

References

External links 

 
 

2009 films
American comedy-drama films
Lesbian-related films
2009 LGBT-related films
2009 comedy-drama films
LGBT-related comedy-drama films
2000s English-language films
2000s American films